Acrapex mischus is a moth of the family Noctuidae. It was described by David Stephen Fletcher in 1959. It is endemic to the Hawaiian island of Oahu.

The wingspan is 28.5 mm for males and 30–33 mm for females.

External links
A New Species of Acrapex (Lepidoptera: Noctuidae) from Hawaii

Xyleninae
Endemic moths of Hawaii